Lower Bhavani Project Canal is a  long irrigation canal which runs in Erode district in Tamil Nadu, India.  The canal is a valley-side contour canal, fed by Bhavanisagar Dam and irrigates 2.07 lakh hectares of land. The main canal feeds Thadapalli and Arakkankottai channels which irrigate the cultivable lands. The canal was the brainchild M.A Eswaran, member of the legislative assembly of the Erode constituency in the early 1950s.

References

See also
Kalingarayan Canal

Erode district
Canals in Tamil Nadu
Gobichettipalayam
Bhavani River